Shanghai Foreign Language Education Press (SFLEP) is a large university press in China. With an affiliate to Shanghai International Studies University, it was founded in December, 1979. The press has published 6000-plus titles with a diversity of 30 languages, including course-books, academic works, reference books, dictionaries, journals and electronic publications.

Imprints and Series

Course Books
College English Series
New Century College English Series
New Century Textbooks for Spanish Major Series
New Century Textbooks for French Major Series
New Century Textbooks for German Major Series
New Century Textbooks for Japanese Major Series
New Century Textbooks for English Major Series
New Century Textbooks for Russian Major Series
New Century Textbooks for Arabic Major Series
New Century Textbooks for Business English Major Series
SFLEP Textbooks for Bachelor of Translation and Interpreting (BTI) Series
SFLEP Textbooks for Master of Translation and Interpreting (MTI) Series
A Course in English-Chinese Translation
A New English Course Series
Postgraduate English Series
Textbooks for Foreign Language School Series
Longman Side by Side (import)

Dictionaries
Большой Китайско-Русский Словарь (SFLEP Chinese-Russian Dictionary)
The New Oxford English-Chinese Dictionary
SFLEP Foreign Language-Chinese Dictionary Series
New Time English-English English-Chinese Dictionary
The New Century Multi-functional English-Chinese Dictionary
A Dictionary of CET-4 Vocabulary Usage
Concise Oxford English Dictionary with Chinese Translation
Longman Active Study English-Chinese Dictionary
Collins COBUILD English-Chinese Learner's Dictionary
Collins Foreign Language-Chinese Dictionary Series
SFLEP Foreign Language-Chinese Military Dictionary Series
Britannica Concise Encyclopedia (import)
広辞苑（Japanese Dictionary）(import)

Journals
Journal of Foreign Languages
Foreign Language World
Foreign Language Testing and Teaching

Organizational structure

International Cooperation
The 'Shanghai Foreign Language Education Press has established and maintained business relationship with over 60 publishing companies in the United States, the United Kingdom, Germany, France, Russia, Spain, Italy, the Netherlands, Denmark, Korea and Japan. Listed below are some of the publishers among the 60-odd:

See also
Shanghai International Studies University

References

External links
Shanghai Foreign Language Education Press
Shanghai International Studies University

Publishing companies established in 1979
Publishing companies of China
Companies based in Shanghai
University presses of China